Rani of Jhansi (1828–1858) was the queen of the princely state of Jhansi in North India.

Jhansi Ki Rani may refer to:

 Jhansi Ki Rani (1953 film), a Hindi historical drama film
 Jhansi Rani (1988 film), a Telugu suspense film
 Jhansi Ki Rani (2009 TV series), an Indian historical drama
 Jhansi Ki Rani (2019 TV series), an Indian historical drama
 "Jhansi Ki Rani" (poem), a poem by Subhadra Kumari Chauhan
Jhansi Ki Rani Regiment, the women's regiment of the Indian National Army